Adesio Rafael Lombardo Rossi (2 February 1925 – before 2004) was an Uruguayan basketball player who competed in the 1948 Summer Olympics and in the 1952 Summer Olympics. Lombardo was part of the Uruguayan basketball team, which finished fifth in the 1948 tournament. Four years later Lombardo was a member of the Uruguayan team, which won the bronze medal. He played all eight matches.

References

External links

1925 births
Year of death missing
Basketball players at the 1948 Summer Olympics
Basketball players at the 1952 Summer Olympics
Olympic basketball players of Uruguay
Olympic bronze medalists for Uruguay
Uruguayan men's basketball players
Uruguayan people of Italian descent
Sportspeople from Montevideo
Olympic medalists in basketball
Medalists at the 1952 Summer Olympics
1954 FIBA World Championship players